Katriina Talaslahti (born 21 September 2000) is a Finnish professional footballer who plays as a goalkeeper for French Division 1 Féminine club Fleury and the Finland national team.

Club career
Talaslahti started her senior career with German side Bayern Munich. In 2019, she signed for Lyon in the French top flight. In 2021, she moved to Fleury.

International career
Talaslahti made her senior team debut for Finland on 12 April 2022 in a 6–0 win against Georgia.

Personal life
Talaslahti's older sister Pauliina Talaslahti is also a footballer. Both of them played together at 1. FC Nürnberg and Bayern Munich.

Career statistics

International

Honours
Bayern Munich II
 2. Frauen-Bundesliga: 2018–19

Lyon
 Coupe de France féminine: 2019–20
 UEFA Women's Champions League: 2019–20

References

External links
 

2000 births
Living people
Women's association football goalkeepers
Division 1 Féminine players
Expatriate women's footballers in France
Expatriate women's footballers in Germany
FC Bayern Munich (women) players
FC Fleury 91 (women) players
Finland women's international footballers
Finnish expatriate sportspeople in France
Finnish expatriate sportspeople in Germany
Finnish women's footballers
Frauen-Bundesliga players
Olympique Lyonnais Féminin players
UEFA Women's Euro 2022 players